Fusilier is an unincorporated hamlet in Antelope Park Rural Municipality No. 322, Saskatchewan, Canada. The hamlet is approximately 30 km west of the Town of Kerrobert at the intersection of Highway 51 and Highway 317. The Canadian Pacific Railway played a big role in the town's economy in its early years but due to the closure of smaller branch lines in the 1980s, the tracks from Kerrobert to Fusilier were pulled and Fusilier's population began to decline.

See also

 List of communities in Saskatchewan
 Hamlets of Saskatchewan

Antelope Park No. 322, Saskatchewan
Unincorporated communities in Saskatchewan
Ghost towns in Saskatchewan
Division No. 13, Saskatchewan